Most Eligible Bachelor is a 2021 Indian Telugu-language romantic comedy film written and directed by Bommarillu Bhaskar and produced by Bunny Vas and Vasu Varma on GA2 Pictures. It stars Akhil Akkineni and Pooja Hegde with music composed by Gopi Sundar, cinematography by Pradeesh Varma and editing by Marthand K. Venkatesh.

The film follows the love story of NRI Harsha and stand-up comedian Vibha. It was released on 15 October 2021 after being repeatedly postponed because of the ongoing COVID-19 pandemic. The film opened to positive reviews with critics praising casts performances (particularly Pooja Hegde and Akhil Akkineni), story, and music. The film was commercially successful and grossed 81 crore worldwide.

Plot 
A couple drives along the road. All of a sudden, they hit a flock of lamb. The couple get a shock on noticing a man among the flock. The man is introduced to be Harsha (Akhil Akkineni). They asked why he was there and he starts narrating his story.

Harsha is an NRI who lives in New York with aspirations to get married as soon as possible. His family then sets up a marriage for him that has to be completed within 20 days. Excited, Harsha buys himself a house and flies to India for his marriage. In India, he is set to meet 20 prospective brides and he ends up liking the first one he meets. However, his family insists on meeting more to see which one is the perfect match for him. Meanwhile, Harsha's mother tells him to drop a certain bride's details off since their horoscope did not match. Harsha opens the envelope to see that it is Vibha (Pooja Hegde) but he still goes to her father and gives back the details. He then realizes that Vibha's father is Subbu (Murali Sharma) with whom he had a horrible interaction earlier. On top of this, he loses Vibha's picture so Subbu holds his friend captive. In an attempt to find the picture, he meets Vibha at her stand-up comedy show and asks her for her picture. Vibha then asks a series of questions that disrupt Harsha's mentality about marriage. By being with Vibha, he realises that he wants to marry her.

Unexpectedly, Harsha has his marriage set with another girl. In an attempt to get together with Vibha, he goes to Subbu to convince him. However, in a turn of events, Subbu files a case against Harsha for being vulgar in each of his meetings with the brides. Vibha realizes that it was her words that affected Harsha and convinces Subbu to take back the case. Harsha, wanting answers, goes to Vibha and admits to liking her but she says she rejected him over twenty days ago as his mentality about marriage is not the same as hers. An enraged Harsha leaves for New York and tries to understand what went wrong. After attending Ganesh's 25th wedding anniversary and talking with his brother-in-law, he discovers that their marriage is toxic and that he shouldn't compromise at all.

Nine months pass by and Harsha is a completely changed man with a new mindset. In an attempt to merge his and Megha's companies, he makes her fall for him. Megha's parents want her to marry Harsha even though Harsha still likes Vibha. With his marriage in 20 days, he decides to leave for India early so that he can see Vibha again. On returning to India, he finds out that Vibha does not want to get married due to a painful experience she has. So anonymously, Harsha tries to get Vibha to change back to her old lifestyle and manages to make her fall for him. However, Harsha's parents find out and make him leave Vibha while Subbu simultaneously lets Vibha know that Harsha is getting married and to give up. At his wedding, Vibha shows up to do a stand-up show and Harsha is shocked to see her there. She then narrates her experiences in life with Harsha and then sadly leaves. Megha, who knows all of this, allows Harsha to reunite with Vibha and he manages to convince everyone. In the end, Harsha and Vibha get married and go back to New York.

Cast

Production

Development 
In February 2019, director Bhaskar teamed up with Akhil for GA2 Pictures production under Bunny Vasu. In May 2019, the film was officially launched at Film Nagar Temple, Hyderabad with a pooja ceremony. The music is composed by Gopi Sunder while V. Manikandan and Marthand K. Venkatesh were signed as the cinematographer and editor respectively. Manikandan later replaced by Pradeesh Varma, due to the former's exit citing schedule conflicts. Director Vasu Varma is co-producing along with Bunny Vas. The title was announced as Most Eligible Bachelor in February 2020. The film is presented by Allu Aravind of Geetha Arts.

Casting 
The film's casting crew auditioned over 100 actresses and models for leading actress role. Pooja Hegde and Eesha Rebba were finalized as the leads in August 2019. Murali Sharma, Vennela Kishore, Jayaprakash, Pragathi and Aamani were cast in supporting role Akkineni's role was Harsha, an NRI (non-resident Indian) while Pooja Hegde featured as a stand-up comedian named Vibha. In an interview with The Indian Express, Akhil told about the film that "We tried perfecting it more and more, and it has come to where it is today because of the time we had. I am so happy that finally after two years I am having a release".

Filming 
The principal photography of the film began in July 2019 in Hyderabad. Hegde joined the sets in September 2019. The film is shot extensively in major portions of New York in mid-January 2020. Filming took place in Hyderabad in mid-March 2020, however, came to a halt after Akkineni was injured in the sets. Filming was further delayed due to the COVID-19 pandemic lockdown in India. Filming was resumed in  September 2020. Akkineni and Hegde joined the shoot the same month. The filming was completed in March 2021.

Soundtrack 

The music was composed by Gopi Sundar, who earlier collaborated with Bhaskar for the 2016 Tamil film Bangalore Naatkal. On 2 March 2020, the film's first single titled "Manasa Manasa" sung by Sid Sriram and written by Surendra Krishna was unveiled on social media platforms. Less than a year later, on 13 February 2021, the second song "Guche Gulabi" sung by Armaan Malik and written by Ananta Sriram and Sri Mani was released. On 5 April 2021, a third song "Ye Zindagi" sung by Haniya Nafisa and Gopi Sundar and written by Ramajogayya Sastry was released. On 15 September 2021, the fourth song "Leharaayi", written by Sri Mani and sung by Sid Sriram was released. On 11 October 2021, four days before the film's release, the fifth song "Chitti Adugu" was released. The song is written by Sirivennela Seetharama Sastry and sung by Zia Ul Haq.

Original Non-film Track List

Release 
Most Eligible Bachelor'''s release was scheduled for 2 April 2020, during Sri Rama Navami, but was delayed due to the COVID-19 pandemic. It was pushed back to January 2021, then to April 2021. In February 2021, the film's release date was announced as 19 June 2021. With the second wave of COVID-19 pandemic impacting India and shutting down cinemas again, the release was again delayed. In August 2021, the film was scheduled to be released on 8 October 2021.

Sarigama Cinemas have acquired the film's distribution rights in the United States.

 Home media 
In late September, the release date was rescheduled to 15 October 2021, on the occasion of Dussehra. Digital streaming rights of the film were acquired by both aha and Netflix. The film was premiered on aha on 19 November 2021 while it premiered on Netflix on 23 November 2021.

Reception

 Critical response 
The film opened to positive reviews with critics praising casts performances (particularly Pooja Hegde and Akhil Akkineni), story, and music.
Neeshita Nyayapati of The Times of India gave a rating of 3 out of 5 and cited it as "a breezy rom-com that lacks emotional depth". She further added that "Most Eligible Bachelor remains the story of a man who thinks he has it all to make a good husband and a woman giving him a reality check.". A critic of Sify too cited the same and rated it 2.75 out of 5, writing " Most Eligible Bachelor looks patchy, and goes all directions but Gopi Sundar's lilting songs and feel-good romantic moments save it". Firstpost also gave a rating of 3 out of 5, praising Bhaskar's work but giving mixed response to the story and screenplay. In their review, The Hans India wrote that "Most Eligible Bachelor has a thin storyline but it has got a lot of scopes to explore. Director Bhaskar who made a comeback to Tollywood is already known for dealing with strong yet sensitive emotions. However, for this project, the director put his focus on delivering the entertainment rather than pulling the project off with emotions. The first half looks fun and entertaining with a lot of interesting elements. However, the second half falls flat with weak writing and it gets into a preachy mode". The News Minute's Balakrishna Ganeshan cited that "the film makes progressive take on arranged marriage with a few misses", giving a rating of 3 out of 5.

Writing for Cinema Express, Ram Venkat Srikar wrote that the romance is boring and the comedy is forgettable. Srikar felt that most of the film's second half feels like a spin-off to the filmmaker's 2010 film Orange. He further wrote: "Most Eligible Bachelor holds its intentions in high regard and in the process, ends up being a tiring watch". The Hindu Sangeetha Devi Dundoo felt that "Most Eligible Bachelor has technical finesse, a pleasing lead pair, offers a few laughs and hummable songs, but doesn’t sweep you off your feet. Pooja Hegde is lovely as Vibha and shows that she has more acting potential waiting to be tapped. Akhil Akkineni shows a lot of improvement as an actor and is good as Harsha. Among the melee of supporting actors, only Murali Sharma stands out."

J Jagannath  of Business Standard'' opined that the director seems to have set out to write an Alice Munro-like story only to end up with something straight out of the slushpile every production house in this country is bombarded with, adding that "The movie has the soul and ambience of a fitting room at Zara. Apart from Akhil, Pradeesh Varma’s eye-pleasing cinematography and Gopi Sundar’s peppy soundtrack are the movie’s redeeming factors". Jeevi of Idlebrain in his review stated – "The climax of the film is preachy with Bommarillu Bhaskar trying to recreate the climax from his classic Bommarillu. Most Eligible Bachelor is not a bad film and it's better than most of the recent releases. However, it falls short of being a good film. The packaging of the film, music and Dasara holidays will do good for the film".

Box office 
On the opening day, the film collected a gross collection of ₹8 crore worldwide. It collected a gross of ₹3 crore worldwide, on its second day. Thus, making the worldwide total two-days box office collection as ₹11 crore. Its third day gross collection was ₹15 crore. At the Australian box office, the film collected a gross of A$60,150 in the first three days. By the second day of release, it has collected a gross of $450,000 at the United States box office. After one week of its release, the total worldwide gross collections of the film were ₹20 crore. The film grossed ₹50 crore worldwide after 17 days of its release and is a commercial success.

References

External links 

Indian romantic comedy films
2020s Telugu-language films
Films postponed due to the COVID-19 pandemic
Films scored by Gopi Sundar
2021 films
2021 romantic comedy films
Geetha Arts films
Films shot in Hyderabad, India
Films set in Hyderabad, India
Films shot in New York City
Films set in New York City
Indian films set in New York City